Michael Schwarzmann (born 7 January 1991 in Kempten) is a German cyclist, who currently rides for UCI WorldTeam .
He was named in the start list for the 2016 Vuelta a España. In May 2019, he was named in the startlist for the 2019 Giro d'Italia.

Major results
Source:
2009
 1st Stage 4 Regio-Tour Juniors
2016
 1st Stage 5 Tour d'Azerbaïdjan
2019
 4th Grand Prix of Aargau Canton
2020
 10th Druivenkoers Overijse

Grand Tour general classification results timeline

References

External links

1991 births
Living people
German male cyclists
People from Kempten im Allgäu
Sportspeople from Swabia (Bavaria)
Cyclists from Bavaria